The New England Free Jacks are a professional rugby union team in Major League Rugby (MLR) based in the Greater Boston area. They were announced in September 2018 and began to compete professionally in October 2018. They competed in their first season in MLR in the 2020 season.

History
On September 21, 2018, Major League Rugby announced that Boston would be one of the expansion teams joining the league for the 2020 season. That same day, the Boston club was announced as the New England Free Jacks through social media. Their first match was on October 20, 2018, against the Ontario Arrows at Wanderers Grounds in Halifax, Nova Scotia.  Early rosters from these matches included a mixture of veteran professional players from the disbanded PRO Rugby competition and top local talent from clubs such as the Boston Irish Wolfhounds and Mystic River.

NFL players Nate Ebner and Patrick Chung are minority owners of the Free Jacks.

Sponsorship

Roster

The New England Free Jacks squad for the 2023 Major League Rugby season is:

 Senior 15s internationally capped players are listed in bold.
 MLR teams are allowed to field up to ten overseas players per match.

Head coaches
  Josh Smith (2018–2020)
  Ryan Martin (2020–2021)
 Scott Mathie (2021-present)

Captains
 Josh Larsen (2020–present)

Leadership

Staff for 2022 Major League Rugby Season:

Owners

Records

Season standings

Notes

Head coaches

2019 season
All games in the 2019 season were exhibition games and did not count in the league standings; the team played to a record of 1–7, losing their first seven games and winning their final match of the season.

2020 season

On March 12, 2020, MLR announced the season would go on hiatus immediately for 30 days due to fears surrounding the COVID-19 pandemic. Seven days later, MLR announced that the season was officially cancelled. The Free Jacks finished the short season 9th in the MLR, 6th in the Eastern Conference.

Exhibition

Regular season
The team accrued a 1–4 record before the season was halted.

2021 season
The Free Jacks' first game of the 2021 season was played on March 20, facing LA Giltinis in Los Angeles.

Source:

2022 season

Regular season

Source:

Post season

Entertainment

Mascot 
On May 7, 2021, the Free Jacks announced a mascot, Woodgy, a furry blue creature with rugby headband tape who wears Free Jacks rugby kit.

Academy

New England Independents
On January 8, 2020, the Free Jacks announced that they would compete in two preseason matches against the New England Independents, a brand new select team of local All-Star talent representing eight clubs throughout New England. Adam Zilcoski, of the Boston Irish Wolfhounds, was selected as the head coach.

Roster
Squad for 2020 Major League Rugby Preseason:

Regional academies

Junior Jacks
The Junior Jacks are the youth academy level for the Free Jacks.

References

External links
 

 
Major League Rugby teams
Rugby union teams in Massachusetts
Rugby clubs established in 2018
2018 establishments in Massachusetts